John Baker White may refer to:

John Baker White (clerk of court) (1794–1862), American military officer, lawyer, court clerk, and civil servant
John Baker White (West Virginia politician) (1868–1944), American military officer, lawyer, and politician in West Virginia
John Baker White (British politician) (1902–1988), British politician

See also
John Baker (disambiguation)
John White (disambiguation)
White (surname)